The Weimaraner is a large dog that was originally bred as a hunting dog in the early 19th century. Early Weimaraners were used by royalty for hunting large game such as boar, bear and deer. As the popularity of large game hunting began to decline, Weimaraners were used for hunting smaller animals like fowl, rabbits and foxes.

The Weimaraner is an all-purpose gun dog. The name comes from the Grand Duke of Saxe-Weimar-Eisenach, Karl August, whose court, located in the city of Weimar (now in the state of Thuringia in modern-day Germany), enjoyed hunting. The Weimaraner possesses traits such as speed, stamina, great sense of smell, great eyes, courage, and intelligence. The breed is sometimes referred to as the "grey ghost" of the dog world originating from its ghostly coat and eye color along with its stealthy hunting style.

History

The Weimaraner was kept in the Weimar court in the 19th century and carried a good deal of Leithound ancestry. Two theories propose that they descended from the Chien-gris dogs, or the St. Hubert hound whose descendant is the bloodhound. In the beginning, Germany's Grand Duke Karl August used the Weimaraner to hunt big-game like wolves, bears, and mountain lions, but as Europe's number of big-game animals decreased, the Weimaraner turned into a point and retrieve hunter of small game. The breed arrived to America in the late 1920s, and its popularity increased in the 1950s. The breed became popular due to celebrities like Grace Kelly, President Dwight D. Eisenhower, and Dick Clark. The famous artist and photographer William Wegman increased the breed's popularity even more with his world famous Weimaraner portraits and video segments.

Description

Appearance
The Weimaraner is athletic in appearance. Traditionally, the tail is docked. In countries where this is still carried out, the docked tail should measure approximately 6 inches in the adult dog, and this is part of the American Kennel Club breed standard.  Tail docking is illegal in several countries, where the breed is shown with an entire tail. The British Kennel Club breed standard describes a tail reaching to the hocks and carried below the level of the back when relaxed, and the German breed club standard calls for a full tail that is strong and well coated, which can be carried above the line of the back when the dog is working. Weimaraners are great water dogs as evidenced by their webbed paws.

The eyes of the Weimaraner may be light amber, grey or blue-grey and the ears are long and velvety.

Coat and color

This breed's short coat and unusual eyes give it a distinctive regal appearance. The coat is extremely low-maintenance, short, hard, and smooth to the touch, and may range from charcoal-blue to mouse-grey to silver-grey or even blue-grey. Where the fur is thin or non-existent, inside the ears or on the lips for example, the skin should be pinkish rather than white or black. This breed does not have an undercoat, so extreme cold should be avoided. While their coat is short, this breed does shed.

In November 2009 and January 1, 2010, the United Kennel Club (UKC) removed the disqualification from both Blue and Longhair Weimaraners. A black coat remains an automatic disqualification, though a small white marking in the chest area only is permitted. Dogs with blue coats are disqualified from conformation/show competition, but are recognized as purebred Weimaraners by the AKC.  There is another incidental variety, described as having the "mark of the hound", where the dog is the usual grey colour but with faint tan markings (similar to Doberman Pinschers). Weimaraners can have several unique physical characteristics such as small lobes on the inside of the ear, known as "Harrasburg Horns", and "Grafmar's Caps", very light gray patches between the ears.

A long-haired variety is recognized by most kennel clubs around the world except the American Kennel Club. The long-haired Weimaraner has a silky coat with an undocked, feathered tail.  The gene is recessive, so breeding will produce some long-haired puppies only if both parents carry the trait.

Size
A Weimaraner should give the appearance of a muscular, athletic dog.

Temperament

The Weimaraner is an energetic hunting dog, prized for its physical endurance and stamina, with a strong, instinctive prey-drive. It may tolerate cats but usually does not, tending to follow the urge to huntno matter how long it has known a particular catand likely to chase and kill any small animal that enters the garden. A Weimaraner requires frequent exercise and will appreciate games and play. An active owner is more likely to provide the vigorous exercise and games required. A Weimaraner requires appropriate training to learn how to be calm and control its behavior.

As a hunting dog
Weimaraners have an excessive amount of energy that requires a good outlet.  They are well-rounded hunting dogs that excel at hunting, tracking, pointing and retrieving both on land and in the water.  The Weimaraner is a very people-oriented breed.  They have a very strong desire to work and live with their owners, making the breed a good choice for the novice hunter. It requires a gentle touch when training to hunt and it often learns best from a seasoned hunting dog.

Behavior disorders
Weimaraners are not an independent breed and love to be with their owner, never leaving them alone.  This can create very severe separation anxiety in the breed. The causes of separation anxiety are not always known, but there are contributing factors including genetics, litter rearing, poor socialization, boredom, and stress.  Weimaraners with severe separation anxiety can destroy property or injure themselves in trying to escape.  Good training can curb some of the separation anxiety. A Weimaraner with separation anxiety is likely to bark, whine, howl and even dig until its owner returns home. Further manifestations of this problem can include panicking and excessive drooling, along with destructive behaviors and injury.

Health
According to the Orthopedic Foundation for Animals, Weimaraners enjoy low rates of dysplasia. The breed is ranked 102nd of 153 total breeds and has a very high test rate and a very high percentage of excellent rating among those dogs tested.  It is generally recommended to acquire Weimaraners only from breeders who have their dogs' hips tested using OFA or PennHIP methods.

As a deep-chested dog, the Weimaraner is prone to bloat or gastric torsion, a very serious condition that can cause painful and rapid death when left untreated. It occurs when the stomach twists itself, thereby pinching off blood vessels and the routes of food traveling in or out. Symptoms include signs of general distress, discomfort, no bowel movement or sounds and a swollen stomach. Immediate medical attention is imperative when bloat occurs and surgery is the only option if it is caught early enough.

One way to help prevent bloat is to spread out the Weimaraner's feedings to at least twice daily and to avoid any vigorous exercise an hour before or after meals. It is also recommended that the dog's feeding dish not be placed on a raised platform to discourage it from gobbling its food too quickly and keep air from entering the stomach.  Raised food bowls have been found to more than double the risk of bloat in large dogs.

Skin allergies are common among weimaraners. A vet should be consulted if a dog starts to lose hair, itch constantly or develop rashes. Parasites can cause an allergic reaction in addition to the normal irritation resulting from bites.

Other health issues include:

 Cryptorchidism
 Distichiasis
 Elbow dysplasia
 Entropion
 Pituitary dwarfism
 Hypertrophic osteodystrophy
 Hypomyelinogenesis
 Hypothyroidism
 Progressive retinal atrophy
 Renal dysplasia
 Von Willebrands Disease

See also

 Dogs portal
 List of dog breeds
 William Wegman (photographer), known for his many photographs of the breed

References

External links

 
 The Weimaraner Pedigree database

Dog breeds originating in Germany
FCI breeds
Gundogs
Pointers